Jingji may refer to:

Jingji Circuit (Tang dynasty) (京畿道), a Tang dynasty circuit around its capital Chang'an
Jingji Circuit (Song dynasty) (京畿路), a Song dynasty circuit around its capital Kaifeng Prefecture

See also
Gyeonggi Province, Korean equivalent
Kinki
Kinh Kỳ, Vietnamese equivalent, is a nickname of Hanoi